Chilseong Market Station is a station of the first line of Daegu, South Korea. It is located in Chilseong Market.

References

External links

 Cyber station information  from Daegu Metropolitan Transit Corporation

Buk District, Daegu
Railway stations opened in 1998
Daegu Metro stations